Viseu is a municipality in Portugal.

Viseu or Vișeu may also refer to:

 Vișeu, a tributary of the river Tisza in northern Romania
 Viseu, Pará, a municipality in Pará, Brazil
 Vișeu de Jos, a commune in Maramureș County, Romania
 Vișeu de Sus, a town in Maramureș County, Romania
 Viseu Airport,  in Viseu, Portugal
 Viseu District, a district in the Northern and Centro regions of Portugal
 Viseu 2001, a sports club in Viseu, Portugal

People
 Duke of Viseu, a Portuguese royal dukedom, including a list of people bearing the title
 Eleanor of Viseu (1458–1525), Portuguese infanta and later queen consort of Portugal
 Isabel of Viseu (1459–1521), daughter of Infante Fernando, Duke of Viseu, and Infanta Beatrice